Senegalia nigrescens, the knobthorn, is a deciduous African tree, growing up to 18 m tall, that is found in savanna regions from West Africa to South Africa. The tree is resistant to drought, not resistant to frost and its hard wood is resistant to termites.

Ecology 
Giraffes often browse on the flowers and foliage of this tree, while the seed pods and foliage are browsed on by a range of mammals, including elephants.

Uses 
An ointment made from the roots has traditionally been used to treat convulsions.

Gallery

References

External links

nigrescens
Trees of Africa